Drymatus tesselatus is a species of beetle in the family Carabidae, the only species in the genus Drymatus.

References

Lebiinae